M44 or M-44 may refer to:

Transportation
 BMW M44, an inline 4 gasoline engine produced by BMW
 M-44 (Michigan highway), a state highway in Michigan
 M44 (Cape Town), a Metropolitan Route in Cape Town, South Africa
 M44 (Johannesburg), a Metropolitan Route in Johannesburg, South Africa
 M44 motorway (Hungary), an under-construction motorway
 MÁV Class M44, the Polish code-name for a Hungarian shunting diesel locomotive

Weaponry
 44M Tas, a Hungarian medium/heavy tank design of World War II
 ALFA M44, a Spanish machine gun developed during World War II
 Hungarian 44M, an unguided anti-tank rocket designed by Hungary in World War II
 M44 generator cluster, an American chemical cluster bomb
 M44 self propelled howitzer, 1950s US self-propelled 155 mm artillery
 Panssarimiina m/44, a Finnish anti-tank blast mine
 Tikkakoski M44, a Finnish submachine gun
 A model of the Mosin–Nagant, a Russian bolt-action rifle
 A Yugoslav People's Army's internal designation of SU-100 self-propelled gun

Other uses
 IBM M44/44X, an experimental IBM mainframe from the 1960s
 M44 (cyanide device), a device used to poison predators
 Messier 44 (M44), an open star cluster also called the Beehive Cluster
 Progress M-44, a spacecraft used to resupply the International Space Station
  USS Vigor (AM-473), a U.S. Navy Agile-class minesweeper
 The 44th Mersenne prime